45300 Thewrewk, provisional designation , is a dark background asteroid from the outer regions of the asteroid belt, approximately 13 kilometers in diameter. It was discovered on 1 January 2000, by astronomers Krisztián Sárneczky and László Kiss at the Piszkéstető Station of the Konkoly Observatory in Hungary. The asteroid was named after Hungarian astronomer Aurél Ponori Thewrewk.

Orbit and classification 

When applying the hierarchical clustering method to this asteroid's proper orbital elements, Thewrewk is both a non-family asteroid from the main belt's background population (according to Nesvorný) and a core member of the Eos family (according to Milani and Knežević). It orbits the Sun in the outer asteroid belt at a distance of 2.9–3.4 AU once every 5 years and 6 months (1,997 days; semi-major axis of 3.10 AU). Its orbit has an eccentricity of 0.08 and an inclination of 10° with respect to the ecliptic.

Physical characteristics

Diameter and albedo 

According to the survey carried out by the NEOWISE mission of NASA's Wide-field Infrared Survey Explorer, Thewrewk measures 13.230 kilometers in diameter and its surface has an albedo of 0.077.

Rotation period 

As of 2017, no rotational lightcurve of Thewrewk has been obtained from photometric observations. The body's rotation period, shape and poles remain unknown.

Naming 

This minor planet was named after Hungarian astronomer Aurél Ponori Thewrewk (1921–2014), who was an expert on the history of astronomy, director of Urania Public Observatory and the Budapest Planetarium, as well honorary president of the Hungarian Astronomical Association (HAA).

The official naming citation was published by the Minor Planet Center on 25 January 2005.

References

External links 
 Asteroid Lightcurve Database (LCDB), query form (info )
 Dictionary of Minor Planet Names, Google books
 Asteroids and comets rotation curves, CdR – Observatoire de Genève, Raoul Behrend
 Discovery Circumstances: Numbered Minor Planets (45001)-(50000) – Minor Planet Center
 
 

045300
Discoveries by Krisztián Sárneczky
Discoveries by László L. Kiss
Named minor planets
20000101